Nguyễn Mạnh Dũng (born April 29, 1981) is a Vietnamese football goalkeeper who plays for The Vissai Ninh Bình and a member of Vietnam national football team since 2011 to 2014.

References

External links

Vietnamese footballers
1981 births
Living people
People from Haiphong
Association football goalkeepers
Footballers at the 2002 Asian Games
Asian Games competitors for Vietnam
Vietnam international footballers
Haiphong FC players
V.League 1 players
Hòa Phát Hà Nội FC players
Vissai Ninh Bình FC players